Yevgeni Igorevich Grachyov (born February 21, 1990), also known as Evgeny Grachev, is a Russian professional ice hockey centreman who is currently playing for Admiral Vladivostok of the Kontinental Hockey League (KHL). He was drafted into the National Hockey League (NHL) by the New York Rangers in 2008, playing 34 games in the NHL for both the Rangers and St. Louis Blues between 2010 and 2012 prior to joining the KHL.

Playing career
Grachyov played one game with Lokomotiv Yaroslavl of the Russian Superleague (RSL) in the 2007–08 season. He was then selected 75th overall by the New York Rangers in the 2008 NHL Entry Draft on June 21, 2008. He was also drafted 40th overall in the Canadian Hockey League (CHL) Import Draft by the Brampton Battalion of the Ontario Hockey League (OHL). After scoring 40 goals and 40 assists for 80 points in 60 games and posting a +48 plus-minus rating, Grachyov was announced as the winner of the Emms Family Award as OHL Rookie of the Year on April 8, 2009.

In the 2009–10 season, Grachyov played with the Hartford Wolf Pack of the American Hockey League (AHL), the Rangers' top-level minor league affiliate, where he scored 12 goals and 16 assists in his first season as a professional in North America. He was called up to the Rangers on October 8, 2009, but was later reassigned to Hartford the following day without playing having played a game for New York.

Grachyov was again called up to the Rangers on October 28, 2010, and made his NHL debut against the Carolina Hurricanes on October 29, 2010. He was returned to Hartford on November 8 after playing six games for the Rangers. On January 23, 2011, he was again promoted to New York, but again sent down for two games with the Connecticut Whale – the Rangers' new AHL affiliate – during the NHL All-Star break. He was recalled to the Rangers on January 30, 2011, but returned to the Whale on February 1 without playing another game with the Rangers. In 73 games with the Whale in 2010–11, Grachyov scored 16 goals and had 22 assists for 38 total points. He also tied with Pavel Valentenko for the team lead with a plus/minus rating of +21.

On June 25, 2011, Grachyov was traded to the St. Louis Blues in exchange for a third-round draft pick in 2011. His first NHL point came on an assist in a game against the Philadelphia Flyers on October 22, 2011. Grachyov scored his first career NHL goal on December 26 against the Dallas Stars' Andrew Raycroft. Grachyov played another season in the USA, for the now defunct  Peoria Rivermen, before returning to play in his native Russia. Grachyov initially playsed for  Admiral Vladivostok before leaving them to play for several other teams, returning to Admiral Vladivostok in the 2021-22 season.

Career statistics

Regular season and playoffs

International

Awards and achievements
 2008–09 OHL Emms Family Award

References

External links
 

1990 births
Living people
Admiral Vladivostok players
Amur Khabarovsk players
Avangard Omsk players
Avtomobilist Yekaterinburg players
Brampton Battalion players
Connecticut Whale (AHL) players
Dinamo Riga players
Hartford Wolf Pack players
Lokomotiv Yaroslavl players
New York Rangers draft picks
New York Rangers players
Sportspeople from Khabarovsk
Peoria Rivermen (AHL) players
Russian ice hockey centres
St. Louis Blues players
Torpedo Nizhny Novgorod players